Risan is a surname. Notable people with the surname include:

Hank Risan (born 1955), American business executive, scientist, and creator of digital media rights and security patents
Knut Risan (1930–2011), Norwegian actor
Leidulv Risan (born 1948), Norwegian screenwriter, film director and professor